Harold L. "Trey" Stewart III (born February 7, 1994) is an American politician from Maine. Stewart, a Republican from Presque Isle, has represented District 2 in the Maine Senate since 2020 when he replaced Democrat Michael E. Carpenter. From 2016 to 2020, Stewart served in the Maine House of Representatives. During the 2019-20 session, he served as Assistant Minority Leader.

Following his re-election in November 2022, Stewart was named Senate Minority Leader. Fellow Aroostook County Senator Troy Jackson was re-elected as Senate President.

Background
Stewart earned a BA in political science and sociology (2016) and an MBA from the University of Maine (2018). As of 2020, he attended the University of Maine School of Law.

References

1994 births
Living people
Minority leaders of the Maine Senate
People from Presque Isle, Maine
Republican Party Maine state senators
Republican Party members of the Maine House of Representatives
University of Maine School of Law alumni